The 2014 CONCACAF Women's Championship Qualification was a series of women's association football tournaments that determined the participants for the 2014 CONCACAF Women's Championship. Twenty-eight national teams entered the qualification for 6 spots, but three withdrew before playing any match.  The qualification was organised by CONCACAF, the Central American Football Union (UNCAF), and the Caribbean Football Union (CFU). Because the 2014 CONCACAF Women's Championship also served as the CONCACAF qualifying tournament for the 2015 FIFA Women's World Cup, the Championship qualification also served as the first World Cup qualifying stage. Martinique and Guadeloupe were not eligible for World Cup qualification, as they were only members of CONCACAF and not FIFA.

North America (NAFU)
As host, Canada automatically qualified for the 2015 Women's World Cup and did not participate in either the Championship or Championship qualification.  The United States and Mexico received byes directly to the Championship.

Central America (UNCAF)

All seven member nations participated and were split into a group of 3 and a group of 4. Both group winners qualified for the CONCACAF Women's Championship. The group winners met to determine the sole qualifier to the 2015 Pan American Games women's football tournament. The tournament was hosted in Guatemala (UTC−6).

Group 1

Group 2

Play-off for Pan American Games

Goalscorers
6 goals
 Amarelis De Mera

5 goals
 Jenny Alarcón

4 goals

 Raquel Rodríguez
 Marta Cox

3 goals

 Katherine Alvarado
 Diana Barrera

2 goals

 María Monterroso
 Waleska Diaz
 Natalia Mills

1 goal

 Kursha Pollard
 Shandy Vernon
 Gloriana Villalobos
 Lixy Rodríguez
 Wendy Acosta
 Damaris Quéles
 Francisca González
 Ana Martínez
 Coralia Monterroso
 Christian Recinos
 Ali Hall
 Fanny Rodríguez
 Marisela Castellón
 Wendy Umanzor
 Candace Johnson
 Cindy Sotillo
 Emely Dow

1 own goal

 Idania Ramírez (playing against Guatemala)
 Naomi Gamboa (playing against Panama)

Caribbean (CFU)

Qualified teams

North American zone
 (automatic)
 (automatic; hosts)

Central American zone

Caribbean zone

References

External links
World Cup Qualifying – Women, CONCACAF.com
Fútbol Femenino Eliminatoria, UNCAFut.com 
Caribbean Cup, CFUfootball.org
First round results
Final round results

Qualification
2015 FIFA Women's World Cup qualification
Qualification tournaments for the 2015 Pan American Games
2014